Miss Baltic Sea was a beauty pageant for countries that border the Baltic Sea: Denmark, Estonia, Finland, Germany, Latvia, Lithuania, Poland, Russia and Sweden. It merged with Miss Scandinavia for the years 2007 and 2008 and then that merged pageant was discontinued.

Winners

See also
 Miss Denmark, Miss Universe Denmark, Miss World Denmark
 Suomen Neito, Miss Finland
 Miss Sweden, Miss Universe Sweden, Miss World Sweden
 Miss Estonia
 Mis Latvija, Miss Universe Latvia
 Miss Lithuania
 Miss Russia, Krasa Rossii
 Miss Germany, Miss Universe Germany, Miss World Germany
 Miss Polonia, Miss Polski, Miss Earth Poland
 Miss Universe
 Miss World
 Miss International
 Miss Europe

External links
FINNARTISTS
MTV3

Baltic